Fighting Legends Online is a 2001 video game from Maximum Charisma Studios. The game was formerly known as Project TROG.

Development
The game was announced in December 2000.

Reception

IGN gave the game a score of 6.5 out of 10 stating "Overall, neither Fighting Legends' unique features nor its innovative world are significant enough to alter the fact that the game is just a bland, simplistic alternative to other prominent MMOGs"

References

Further reading

2001 video games